Wesley Mastin Bannister (October 11, 1936 – December 10, 2009) was the 39th Mayor of Huntington Beach and served in the position from 1988-1989.  Bannister was elected to the Huntington Beach City Council and served from 1986-1990.

Wes Bannister was a candidate for California Insurance Commissioner.

Wes Bannister was on the Board of Directors for the Orange County Water District from 1991-2009 and served as chairman to the 37 member board of the Metropolitan Water District (MWD).

References

Mayors of Huntington Beach, California
1936 births
2009 deaths
20th-century American politicians